AC-42 is a selective, allosteric agonist of the M1 muscarinic acetylcholine receptor. AC-42 was the first selective M1 agonist to be discovered and its derivatives have been used to study the binding domain of the M1 receptor.

References

Muscarinic agonists
Piperidines
Benzaldehydes